Qingxi may refer to the following locations in China:

Towns 
Written as "清溪镇":
 Qingxi, Chongqing, in Fuling District
 Qingxi, Dongguan, Guangdong
 Qingxi, Shaoshan, in Shaoshan, Hunan